The James Last Orchestra was a German/multinational big-band orchestra. The orchestra was established in 1964 as a studio orchestra, led by jazz musician Hans Last. The orchestra started touring in 1968 and has been very popular worldwide. From 1965, Polydor Records named him 'James Last', as they thought the name 'James' would be more suitable for the international market.

Around 1970 the rhythm section was reorganized as a rock group (lead guitar: Helmuth Franke, rhythm guitar: Peter Hesslein, drums: Barry Roy Reeves, bass: Benny Bendorff, percussion: Christian Lembrecht and later Herbert Bornholdt). Bornholdt and Hesslein were members of the German progressive rock band Lucifer's Friend (another member, Peter Hecht, played with Last for a few years in the late 1970s), and Franke was a member of the pop-rock band Wonderland, whose recordings were produced by Last.

Last initially used many of the musicians who, like himself, were based in Hamburg and were regularly employed by the Norddeutscher Rundfunk (NDR, or North German Radio) big band. Over time, many of the NDR musicians could not always get time off to tour with the Last band, so Last used this chance to make the orchestra more international. Some of the top musicians who have played in the James Last orchestra include Canadian violinist Trudean Conrad, Welsh drummer Terry Jenkins, Belgian trombonist Georges Delagaye, Swedish trumpeter Leif Uvemark and a number of American trumpeters including Bob Lanese, Rick Kiefer and brothers Chuck Findley and Bob Findley. Another trumpeter, Derek Watkins from England, recorded with The Beatles, playing on "Strawberry Fields Forever" and "Revolution 1". Some musicians are family: father-and-son violinists Dmiter Pintev and Stefan Pintev, and husband and wife Bob Coassin (trumpet, USA) and Anne-Louise Comerford (viola, Australia). Bob Coassin is widely known in America. All in all, about 20 different countries are represented in the membership of the orchestra.(All of Which were Recruited through the various James Last Admin Offices in Hamburg, London, and North America when the band became more of a Multi-National orchestra).

James Last took much influence from the world of rock and pop when arranging music for his orchestra. A typical example is his version of "Here Comes the Sun" from the album Beachparty 2 which is influenced by the version sung by Richie Havens in the film Woodstock. Last's epic version of "Greensleeves" is a combination of the styles of Iron Butterfly and Blood, Sweat & Tears, two bands that he publicly declared his favourites in the late 1960s. His studio recordings do not always capture the energy unleashed at his live concerts where a combination of skilful arranging and talented musicians give some surprising performances. His versions of "Nature Boy" featuring Chuck Findley and "MacArthur Park" featuring Derek Watkins are two examples. James Last has so far (2013) sold more than 80 million albums during his career, which has honoured him with 208 Golden and 11 Silver records.
 
On April 17 2014, James Last celebrated his 85th birthday. At the same time, he presented a tour for his band in 2015 which he completed in the spring of 2015, just before he died on 9 June in Florida.

Earlier musicians who have worked with the James Last Orchestra, either live or on record, included:
 Trumpet
 Adam Weckerle (1968–1970), Kuddl Pohle (1968–1970), Manfred Moch (1968–1972, 1976–1977), Heinz Habermann (1968–1972, 1976–1978), Leif Uvemark (1969–1973), Rick Kiefer (1973–1976, 1978), Dieter Kock (1970–1975), Alex Malempre (1972), Bob Lanese (1972–2002), Ack van Rooyen (1975), Eddie Engels (1975), Lennart Axelsson (1973–1977, 1978–1980, 1990–1991), Håkan Nyqvist (1975–2002), Derek Watkins (1976–2007), Gregory Bowen (1978), Lawrence Elam (1977), Kenny Wheeler (1977), Etienne Cap (1977), Jan Kohlin (1980–1981), Bob Coassin (1981–2015), Jan Oosthof (1991, 2002–2015), Ingolf Burkhardt (1991), Stuart Brooks (2002), John Barclay (2002), Martin Krämer {2002), Chuck Findley (2001-), Bob Findley (2002-)
 Trombone
  Manfred Grossmann (1968–1970), Egon Christmann (1968–1969), Waldemar Erbe, Detlef Surmann (1968–1978, 1980–2015), Konrad Bogdan (1969–1984), Wolfgang Ahlers (1970–1972, 1978, 1987), Georges Delagaye (1972–1978), Nick Hauck (1978–1983), Ole Holmquist (1978–2013), Björn Hängsel (1983–1989), Pete Beachill (1995–1999, 2001, 2015), Anders Wiborg (2002–2015), Waldemar Erbe (1991), Mats Lundberg (1990–2001), Horst Raasch
 Saxophone & flute
 Emil Wurster, Karl-Hermann Lüer (1966–1991), Harald Ende (1969–1979), Klaus Nagurski (1976), Werner Rönfeldt (1978), Stan Sulzmann (1979–1987), Hans Udo Heinzmann (1991), Matthias Perl (1991), Matthias Clasen (1999–2007), Herb Geller  (1991), Jamie Talbot, Andy Mackintosh (1988–2002)
 Guitar
 Heinz Schulze (1968–1969), Bernd Steffanowski (1968–1972), Ladi Geisler, Helmuth Franke (1969–1977), Peter Hesslein (1972–1977, 1985-), Big Jim Sullivan (1978–1985), Alan Sparks (1978), Jürgen Schröder (1978), Erlend Krauser (1992-)
 Bass
 Fiete Wacker (1968–1969), Benny Bendorff (1969–2002), Thomas Zurmühlen (2002-)
 Drums
 Robert Last (1965–1972), Barry Roy Reeves (1972–1978), Terry Jenkins (1978–2002), Stephan Eggert (2002–2015)
 Percussion
 Barry Roy Reeves (1970–1972, 1978–1985), Christian Lembrecht (1971–1972), Herbert Bornholdt (1972–1978, 1987–2002) ), Rolf Ahrens (1976–1978), Max Raths, Wolfgang Schlüter (1976–1978), Mathias Korb (1999–2001), Pablo Escayola (2002-)
 Piano, organ, synthesizer, vibes, accordion
Günter Platzek (1965–1990)
 Bandoneon, saxophone
 Jo Ment (1965–2002)
 Keyboards
 James Last, Peter Hecht (1976–1978), Thomas Eggert (1987–2015), John Pearce (1991–2002), Ron Last, Hans Gardemar (1997–2002), Joe Dorff (2002–2015)
 Vocals
 english choir: Sue Glover, Sunny Leslie (1971–1980), Kay Garner (1971–1974), Lyn Cornell (1971–1980), Margot Newman (1971–1972), Jean Hawker (1971–1972, 1978), Russell Stone (1971–1995), Neil Lancaster (1971–1978), Peter Barnfather (1971–1972), Tony Burrows (1971–1980), Joanne Stone (1974–1978), David Martin (1977–1980), Stephanie De Sykes (1977), Lyn White (1978–1979), Madeline Bell (1976, 1980–1983, 2009), Irene Chanter (1979–1983, 1991), Simon Bell (1978–2015), Mac Kissoon (1981–2015), Katie Kissoon (1981–1997), Sonia Jones (1990–2015), Tracey Duncan (1999–2015), Ingrid Arthur (2002–2015), Anella Kissoon, George Chandler (1981–1983), Jimmy Helms (1987–1988), P.P. Arnold (1987), Ruby James (1978, 1987–1997), Sylvia Mason-James (1987–1991), Pearly Gates, Vicki Brown, Jimmy Chambers (1996–2002)
 german choir: Antje Busch, Bernd Wippich, Freya Wippich, Christine Schaper, Peter Schaper, Jörg Fries, Unni Duncklau, Brigitte Duncklau, Michael Reinecke, Rale Oberpichler, Angelika Henschen, Lisa Salzer 
 Strings
 Eugen Raabe, Dmiter Pintev, Trudean Conrad, Gillian Catlow, Anne-Louise Comerford, Stefan Pintev, Juliane Holz, Zwetelina Haubold, Martin Lehmann, Boris Bachmann, Rebecca Thümer, Wulf Lohbeck, Kirsten Ibarra, Nadine Goussi Aguigah, Mathias Brommann, Kiki Zumach, Maria-Elena Pacheco, Katie Vitalie Ekatarina Bolotova, Adrian Bleyer, Katharina Kowalski, Susan Richards.

External links 
 jameslast.com
 James Last at allmusic.com

Musical groups established in 1964
Musical groups disestablished in 2015
Big bands
James Last